Cantharellopsis is a tan- to whitish-colored bryophilous monotypic genus in the Hymenochaetales. The fruit bodies of the single species Cantharellopsis prescotii has a form intermediate between an Omphalina and a chanterelle (Cantharellus) because of its forked, fold-like gills. It inhabits moss on calcareous soils in temperate regions of Europe. Phylogenetically related agarics are in the genera Contumyces, Gyroflexus, Loreleia, Rickenella and Blasiphalia, as well as the stipitate-stereoid genera Muscinupta and  Cotylidia and the clavarioid genus, Alloclavaria.

Etymology

Cantharellopsis is named in reference to its vague similarity to the genus Cantharellus and means, Cantharellus-like.

See also

References

External links
Image

Repetobasidiaceae
Agaricomycetes genera
Fungi of Europe